Mandelbrot may refer to:
 Benoit Mandelbrot (1924–2010), a mathematician associated with fractal geometry
 Mandelbrot set, a fractal popularized by Benoit Mandelbrot
 Mandelbrot Competition, a mathematics competition
 Mandelbrot (cookie), dessert associated with Eastern European Jews
 Szolem Mandelbrojt, a Polish-French mathematician

Jewish surnames
Yiddish-language surnames